Fences is a 2016 American period drama film starring, produced and directed by Denzel Washington and written by August Wilson, based on his Pulitzer Prize-winning 1985 play of the same name.  In addition to Washington, the film also stars Viola Davis, Stephen McKinley Henderson, Jovan Adepo, Russell Hornsby, Mykelti Williamson, and Saniyya Sidney.

Principal photography took place from April 25 to June 14, 2016, in the Hill District of Pittsburgh, Pennsylvania.

Fences was released in North America on December 16, 2016, by Paramount Pictures. It received positive reviews and praise from critics towards Washington's performance and direction, Davis's performance, the screenplay, pacing, cinematography and emotional tone.  Critics found the film "extremely powerful and effective." It was a commercial success, grossing $64 million against a $24 million production budget.

The film was chosen by the American Film Institute as one of the top ten films of 2016, and was nominated for numerous awards, including four Oscar nominations at the 89th Academy Awards: Best Picture, Best Actor (Washington), Best Supporting Actress (Davis) and Best Adapted Screenplay, with Davis winning for her performance. It also received a Golden Globe nomination for Best Actor for Washington and a Best Supporting Actress win for Davis.

Plot
The film takes place in 1950s Pittsburgh at Troy Maxson's house that he lives in with his wife Rose and their son Cory.  Troy works as a garbage collector alongside his best friend, Jim Bono, who he has known for decades.  Troy left home at 14 after beating up his abusive father, and became a robber to sustain himself. While serving time for killing a man during a robbery, he met Bono and showed himself to be a talented baseball player. He then played in the professional Negro leagues; but he never made it to Major League Baseball, which held a "color barrier" until 1947. He claimed to have survived near-fatal pneumonia in his youth by defeating Death in a wrestling match, upon which Death vowed to return for a rematch.

Troy's younger brother, Gabriel, sustained a head injury in World War II that left him mentally impaired, for which he received a $3,000 government payout that Troy subsequently uses as a down payment on a home for his family. Gabriel has since moved out to live across the street at Miss Pearl's house, so Troy no longer gets rent money from Gabe.  This places the family under financial strain. Gabe sometimes gets in trouble with the law for his erratic behavior, so Rose suggests to Troy that Gabe might be better off residing in a hospital.

Lyons, Troy's oldest son from a previous relationship, visits him on payday to borrow money; this upsets him, as he believes a man has a responsibility to work hard to find his own way and provide for his family. 

Rose later tells Troy that Cory is being scouted by a college football team, but he is dismissive of Cory's chances of playing professional football and refuses to sign the permission slip, saying he does not want him to fail in athletics as he did.  Rose asks Troy to build a fence around their house, and he asks Cory to help him on Saturdays. Discovering Cory is not working at his after-school job at the A&P as it interferes with football practice, Troy demands that he return to the job, despite Cory's attempts to convince him that he will work weekends instead of during the week.  Troy later finds out that Cory did not return to his job, and so tells the coach that he is no longer allowed to play.  Cory lashes out, throwing his helmet at Troy, who warns his son not to disrespect him again.

After complaining about his company's racist employment practices, Troy is promoted to driving the garbage truck, becoming the first African-American to do so in Pittsburgh. 

Bono finds out that Troy is cheating on Rose with Alberta, a woman he sees at Taylor's (a bar) and encourages him to break it off.  Troy decides not break it off, as he later reveals this affair to Rose because he gotten Alberta pregnant.  This leads to an argument in which he aggressively grabs Rose's arm, where Cory intervenes and knocks Troy into the fence. 

Months later, the baby is born, but Alberta unfortunately dies during childbirth.  Troy brings his baby daughter Raynell home, and Rose agrees to raise her as her own, but refuses to accept him back into her life. 

Cory is considering enlisting in the United States Marine Corps, having missed his opportunity to attend college with a football scholarship. One day, when Cory returns home, an intoxicated and bitter Troy blocks his path and instigates a fight in which he swings at Troy with a baseball bat. Grabbing the bat from Cory, he drives him out of the yard. Disoriented, Troy once again challenges Death to come for him.  Troy wipes the remonstrances of Rose. Then, drunk, he has a severe fight in front of the house with Cory. 

Six years later, Troy and Alberta's daughter Raynell is playing in the garden. Troy has died of a heart attack, and Cory, now a USMC corporal, returns home, but informs Rose he will not attend the funeral. Rose admits to loving Troy despite his many flaws and pleads that Troy is still a part of him.

Cory reconsiders after sharing memories of Troy with Raynell. Lyons is serving three years in prison for forgery, and gets a furlough to attend the funeral. Similarly, Gabriel is released from the hospital to attend and reunites with his family as they all bid farewell to Troy. Gabriel plays his trumpet and succeeds on the third try for St. Peter to open the gates of Heaven for Troy, and the sun glistens over them.

Cast
 Denzel Washington as Troy Maxson
 Viola Davis as Rose Lee Maxson
 Stephen McKinley Henderson as Jim Bono
 Jovan Adepo as Cory Maxson
 Russell Hornsby as Lyons Maxson
 Mykelti Williamson as Gabriel Maxson
 Saniyya Sidney as Raynell Maxson

Production
The film was adapted from August Wilson's play Fences.  Production culminated in the 2016 release of the film, over a decade after Wilson's death.

Previous attempts to adapt Fences for the screen had been fruitless, partly due to Wilson's insistence on an African-American director. In a 2013 interview with Empire, Denzel Washington expressed his intention to star in and direct an adaptation of Fences, reprising his role from the 2010 Broadway revival of the play, which like the film, was produced by Scott Rudin.

On January 28, 2016, it was reported that Rudin, Washington and Todd Black would produce a film adaptation of the play, directed by Washington and starring Washington and Viola Davis, reprising their roles from the 2010 revival that earned both actors Tony Awards. Playwright and screenwriter Tony Kushner came aboard to build on a draft written by Wilson before his death in 2005. However, Wilson is the only credited screenwriter for the film, while Kushner received a co-producer credit. Black explained that Washington insisted that they remain faithful to Wilson's work, saying, "The star of the movie is the screenplay and August Wilson's words. What Denzel said to me, to Scott, to all the actors, the cinematographer, and the production designer was, 'Don't make any decision without August Wilson's words leading you to make that decision.' Whatever you do, let the words inform your decision first. That's what we all had to abide by."

On April 4, 2016, Mykelti Williamson, Jovan Adepo, Russell Hornsby, Stephen McKinley Henderson and Saniyya Sidney joined the cast, with Williamson, Hornsby and Henderson also reprising their roles from the 2010 production.

On April 25, 2016, it was reported that Fences had begun filming in the Hill District of Pittsburgh. On June 14, 2016, principal photography was completed. Post-production was completed in mid-November. Charlotte Bruus Christensen was the director of photography, David Gropman was the production designer, Sharen Davis was the costume designer, Hughes Winborne edited the film, Sean Devereaux was the visual effects supervisor, and Marcelo Zarvos composed the film's score.

Release
The film held its world premiere at the Curran Theatre in San Francisco, California on December 15, 2016. It began a limited release on December 16, 2016, before opening wide in 2,223 theaters on December 25.

Home media
Fences was released on Digital HD on February 24, 2017, and on Blu-ray and DVD on March 14, 2017.

Reception

Box office
Fences grossed $57.7 million in the United States and Canada and $6.7 million in other territories for a worldwide gross of $64.4 million, against a production budget of $24 million.

Fences opened in five theaters in New York and Los Angeles on December 16, and was expected to gross $50–75,000 per theater in its limited opening weekend. It ended up making a total of $128,000, good for a per-theater average of $32,000. The film went into wide release (2,223 theaters) on Christmas Day and grossed $6.7 million; over its first two days it made $11.5 million. In its first full weekend the following week, the film made $10 million, finishing 6th at the box office.

Critical response
On review aggregator website Rotten Tomatoes, the film has an approval rating of 92% based on 269 reviews, with an average rating of 7.60/10. The site's critical consensus reads, "From its reunited Broadway stars to its screenplay, the solidly crafted Fences finds its Pulitzer-winning source material fundamentally unchanged — and still just as powerful." On Metacritic, the film has a weighted average score of 79 out of 100, based on 48 critics, indicating "generally favorable reviews". Audiences polled by CinemaScore gave the film an average grade of "A−" on an A+ to F scale.

Ty Burr of the Boston Globe wrote, "You don't get groundbreaking cinema from Fences, but what you do get – two titanic performances and an immeasurable American drama – makes up for that." Catherine Shoard of Guardian gave 4 out of 5 stars and praised the performances of Washington and Davis saying " Denzel Washington and Viola Davis set to convert Tonys to Oscars." Terrl White of Empire gave a full 5 stars and calling the film "A simply extraordinary film without crashes, bangs and wallops but full of towering performances delivered with intelligence, power and heart." A.O. Scott of New York Times gave a positive review and highlighted the performances of Washington and Davis by saying " If the sound were to suddenly fail — or if the dialogue were dubbed into Martian — the impact of the performances would still be palpable." Owen Gleiberman of Variety also gave a positive review and praising the performances by saying "The acting is all superb."

In a negative review, David Edelstein of New York wrote, "It's not cinematic enough to make you forget you're watching something conceived for another, more spatially constricted medium, but it's too cinematic to capture the intensity, the concentration, of a great theatrical event."

Accolades

See also

List of black films of the 2010s

References

External links

 
 
 Official screenplay

2016 films
2016 drama films
2010s American films
2010s English-language films
African-American drama films
African-American films
American films based on plays
BAFTA winners (films)
Bron Studios films
Escape Artists films
Films about families
Films about father–son relationships
Films directed by Denzel Washington
Films featuring a Best Supporting Actress Golden Globe-winning performance
Films featuring a Best Supporting Actress Academy Award-winning performance
Films produced by Scott Rudin
Films produced by Denzel Washington
Films scored by Marcelo Zarvos
Films set in the 1950s
Films set in Pittsburgh
Films shot in Pittsburgh
Paramount Pictures films